Ellsworth Webb (November 20, 1931 – November 23, 2017) was an American boxer. He competed in the men's light middleweight event at the 1952 Summer Olympics.

Professional boxing career
Ellsworth, nicknamed "Spider", was a top ranked middleweight contender who fought for the World Boxing Association's (then known as National Boxing Association) version of the world Middleweight title on December 4, 1959, losing by unanimous fifteen round decision to Gene Fullmer in Logan, Utah. He also lost to Dick Tiger but had notable wins over Tiger, Joey GiardelloTerry Downes,Rory Calhoun,Randy Sandy,Holly Mims and Pat McAteer, among others.

Webb had 34 wins and 6 losses in 40 professional boxing matches, with 19 wins and 1 loss (in his last fight, against Tiger) by knockout.

References

1931 births
2017 deaths
American male boxers
Olympic boxers of the United States
Boxers at the 1952 Summer Olympics
Sportspeople from Tulsa, Oklahoma
Light-middleweight boxers